The Aigues, Aigue, Aygues or Eygues is a French river, a tributary of the Rhône. It runs through the departments of Drôme, Hautes-Alpes and Vaucluse. Its source is in the Baronnies mountains. It flows through Verclause, Sahune, Nyons, and it flows into the Rhône at Caderousse.

Several spellings of the name are in use: the French national map service Géoportail shows both "l'Aigues" and "l'Aygues" on maps of the same area near Orange, and the village name of Saint-Maurice-sur-Eygues preserves another variant.

Among its tributaries is the Lauzon.

References

Rivers of France
Rivers of Drôme
Rivers of Hautes-Alpes
Rivers of Vaucluse
Rivers of Auvergne-Rhône-Alpes
Rivers of Provence-Alpes-Côte d'Azur